Jefferson Township is one of fifteen townships in Wayne County, Indiana, United States. As of the 2010 census, its population was 3,482 and it contained 1,514 housing units.

History
Jefferson Township was organized in 1834.

Geography
The streams of Awl Branch, Bat Branch, Bear Creek, Brick Creek, Civil Run, Hartley Run, Morgan Creek, Nettle Creek, Price Creek, Ulrich Creek, Value Run, West Lawn Run and White Branch run through this township.

Cities and towns
 Hagerstown

Adjacent townships
 Dalton Township (north)
 Perry Township (northeast)
 Clay Township (east)
 Harrison Township (southeast)
 Jackson Township (south)
 Liberty Township, Henry County (west)

Cemeteries
The township contains eight cemeteries: Olive Branch, Brick Church, Ulrich, St. Jacobs Lutheran, Felton Family, Baldridge, Unnamed, and West Lawn.

Major highways
  Indiana State Road 1
  Indiana State Road 38

Airports and landing strips
 Hagerstown Airport

Education
Jefferson Township is served by the Hagerstown-Jefferson Township Public Library.

See also
Whitewater Canal

References
 
 United States Census Bureau cartographic boundary files

External links
 Indiana Township Association
 United Township Association of Indiana

Townships in Wayne County, Indiana
Townships in Indiana